Strawberry Roan is a 1933 American pre-Code Western film directed by Alan James and starring Ken Maynard, Ruth Hall and Harold Goodwin.

Cast
 Ken Maynard as Ken Masters 
 Ruth Hall as Alice Edwards 
 Harold Goodwin as Bart Hawkins 
 Frank Yaconelli as Shanty 
 James A. Marcus as Big Jim Edwards 
 William Desmond as Colonel Brownlee 
 Charles King as Curley 
 Jack Rockwell as Henchman Beef 
 Robert D. Walker as Bat 
 Bill Patton as Ranch Hand Slim

References

Bibliography
 Pitts, Michael R. Western Movies: A Guide to 5,105 Feature Films. McFarland, 2012.

External links
 

1933 films
1933 Western (genre) films
American Western (genre) films
Films directed by Alan James
Universal Pictures films
1930s English-language films
1930s American films